Bound in Morocco is a 1918 American silent action romantic comedy film starring Douglas Fairbanks. Fairbanks produced and wrote the film's story and screenplay (under the pseudonym Elton Thomas), and Allan Dwan directed. The film was produced by Douglas Fairbanks Pictures Corporation and distributed by Famous Players-Lasky / Artcraft Pictures.

Plot
As described in a film magazine, George Travelwell (Fairbanks), an American youth motoring in Morocco, discovers that the governor of El Harib (Campeau) has seized a young American woman for his harem. Disguised as an inmate of the harem, George nearly wrecks the place while he rescues her. One thrilling incident follows upon the heels of another in their attempts to get away, and it ends with him setting one tribe against another, leaving them free to peacefully ride away.

Cast

Douglas Fairbanks as George Travelwell
Pauline Curley as Ysail
Edythe Chapman as Ysail's mother
Tully Marshall as Ali Pah Shush
Frank Campeau as Basha El Harib, governor of Harib
Jay Dwiggins as Kaid Mahedi el Menebhi, Lord High Ambassador to Morocco
Fred Burns as Bandit Chief
Albert MacQuarrie
Marjorie Daw (uncredited)
John George as Hunchback (uncredited)
Emma-Lindsay Squier as Townswoman (uncredited)

Preservation
With no prints of Bound in Morocco located in any film archives, it is considered to be a lost film.

See also
List of lost films

References

External links

Lantern slide for Bound in Morocco
Swedish language poster at silenthollywood.com

1918 films
1918 romantic comedy films
American action comedy films
American romantic comedy films
American silent feature films
American black-and-white films
Famous Players-Lasky films
Films directed by Allan Dwan
Films set in Morocco
Lost American films
1910s action comedy films
1918 lost films
1910s American films
Silent romantic comedy films
Silent American comedy films
1910s English-language films